Fu Sheng or Fusheng may refer to:

People
Yan Hui ( 521–481 BC), disciple of Confucius, also known as Fu Sheng (復聖)
Fu Sheng (scholar) (伏生 or 伏勝, 268–178 BC), Confucian scholar during the Qin and Han dynasties
Fu Sheng (Former Qin) (苻生, 335–357), emperor of Former Qin
Alexander Fu Sheng (傅聲, 1954–1983), Hong Kong actor

Towns in China
Fusheng, Chongqing (复盛)
Fusheng railway station
Fusheng, Zhejiang (富盛), in Shaoxing, Zhejiang

Others
Bliss (2006 film) (浮生), Chinese film by Sheng Zhimin
Fusheng (附生), one of the degree types of the imperial examination